The 1981–82 Weber State Wildcats men's basketball team represented Weber State College during the 1981–82 NCAA Division I men's basketball season. Members of the Big Sky Conference, the Wildcats were led by seventh-year head coach Neil McCarthy and played their home games on campus at Dee Events Center in Ogden, Utah.

In the opening semifinal, the Wildcats gave the host Vandals all they could handle at home, but fell short by 

Senior guard Todd Harper was named to the all-conference team, and junior forward Royal Edwards was honorable mention.

Postseason result

|-
!colspan=6 style=| Big Sky tournament

References

External links
Sports Reference – Weber State Wildcats: 1981–82 basketball season

Weber State Wildcats men's basketball seasons
Weber State